The 1888 Wisconsin gubernatorial election was held on November 6, 1888.

Republican nominee William D. Hoard defeated Democratic nominee James Morgan and two other candidates with 49.53% of the vote.

General election

Candidates
Major party candidates
James Morgan, Democratic, businessman
William D. Hoard, Republican, dairy farmer and newspaper editor

Other candidates
E. G. Durant, Prohibition
David Frank Powell, Labor, former mayor of La Crosse

Results

References

Bibliography
 
 
 

1888
Wisconsin
Gubernatorial